David Jolly (October 14, 1924 – May 27, 1963) was a Major League Baseball relief pitcher.

The ,  right-hander was a native of Stony Point, North Carolina. He was signed by the St. Louis Browns as an amateur free agent before the 1946 season. After pitching in the Browns, Cincinnati Reds, and New York Yankees organizations, he was drafted by the Boston Braves from the Yankees in the 1952 rule V draft (December 1). He played for the Milwaukee Braves from 1953 to 1957 and was a member of the 1957 World Series championship team.

Jolly made his major league debut in relief on May 9, 1953, against the Chicago Cubs at Milwaukee County Stadium. From 1953 to 1957, the first five years that the Braves were in Milwaukee, he was second on the pitching staff with 158 relief appearances, an average of almost 32 per season. During those seasons the closer's job was held at different times by Lew Burdette, Ernie Johnson, Jolly, and Don McMahon.

Jolly's best season was 1954, when he was 11–6 with 10 saves and a 2.43 earned run average in 47 games. He finished in the National League Top Ten for winning percentage, games pitched, games finished, and saves.

Career totals for 160 games (159 as a pitcher) include a record of 16–14, 1 game started, 0 complete games, 82 games finished, 19 saves, and an ERA of 3.77. He wielded a strong bat for a pitcher, going 14-for-48 (.292) with 1 home run, 7 runs batted in, and 8 runs scored.

On October 15, 1957, Jolly was purchased from the Braves by the San Francisco Giants, but never again pitched in a big league game.

Jolly died in 1963 at the age of 38 in Durham, North Carolina, one year after he underwent surgery for a brain tumor. He was buried at Stony Point Cemetery, Stony Point, North Carolina.

References

1955 Baseball Register published by The Sporting News

External links

Retrosheet

1924 births
1963 deaths
Baseball players from North Carolina
Columbia Reds players
Deaths from brain cancer in the United States
Deaths from cancer in North Carolina
Neurological disease deaths in North Carolina
Houston Buffs players
Kansas City Blues (baseball) players
Major League Baseball pitchers
Milwaukee Braves players
Mobile Bears players
Mooresville Moors players
People from Stony Point, North Carolina
Portsmouth-Norfolk Tides players
Syracuse Chiefs players
Tulsa Oilers (baseball) players
Vancouver Mounties players
Wichita Braves players